Darts Creek is a rural locality in the Gladstone Region, Queensland, Australia.

Geography 
Apart from a strip of rural residential housing along Darts Creek Road, the predominant land use is grazing on native vegetation.

History 

Education 
There are no schools in Darts Creek. The nearest government primary school is Ambrose State School in neighbouring Ambrose to the south. The nearest secondary schools are Mount Larcom State School (to Year 10) in neighbouring Mount Larcom to the south-east and Gladstone State High School (to Year 12) in West Gladstone to the south-east.

References 

Gladstone Region
Localities in Queensland